Luca Banti (born 27 March 1974 in Livorno) is an Italian football referee. In 2009, he became a UEFA Category three referee and at the start of 2010 he was promoted to category two and later to category one.

Banti became a FIFA referee in 2009. He has served as a referee in 2014 World Cup qualifiers.

References

1974 births
Italian football referees
Living people
People from Livorno